Tamallalt is a town in El Kelaa des Sraghna Province, Marrakesh-Safi, Morocco. According to the 2004 census it had a population of 12,212. It recorded a population of 16,539 in the 2014 Moroccan census.

References

Populated places in El Kelâat Es-Sraghna Province
Municipalities of Morocco